Chavand is a village in Lathi taluka in Amreli district, Gujarat, India. It is situated to the north of Amreli. The main road linking Rajkot and Bhavnagar and Amreli passes through Chavand.

History

During the British period, it was originally under Babra village, was acquired by the Gaekwad during the government of the peninsula by Vithalrav Devaji.

Demographics
The population according to the census of 1872 was 1280.

Schools in and around Chavand
 Chavand Pay School And C R C Center
 Kankiya Maheta High School Chavand
 Hirana Bal Bhavan School
 Shree Vandaliya Prathamik School

References

 This article incorporates text from a publication now in the public domain: 

Villages in Amreli district